Potamonautes didieri is a species of crab in the family Potamonautidae. It is endemic to the Democratic Republic of the Congo, but has not been observed for 100 years; it is therefore listed as Data Deficient on the IUCN Red List.

References

Potamoidea
Arthropods of the Democratic Republic of the Congo
Endemic fauna of the Democratic Republic of the Congo
Freshwater crustaceans of Africa
Crustaceans described in 1904
Taxa named by Mary J. Rathbun
Taxonomy articles created by Polbot